Vesperus xatarti is a species of brown coloured beetle in the family Vesperidae, found in the Balearic Islands, France, and Spain.

References

External links
Image of a Vesperus xatarti pair
Images of Vesperus xatarti on Flickr
Video of Vesperus xatarti on YouTube

Vesperidae
Beetles described in 1839
Beetles of Europe